The keys of the kingdom is a Christian concept of eternal church authority. Christians believe it was established in the 1st century AD, initially through Saint Peter, then through the rest of the 12 Apostles. The latter, continuing with the early Church Fathers, would eventually comprise the early church and its doctrine. It is this authority, having been given the keys, that subsequent doctrinal points have been built upon.

The authority can be literally traced to one passage in the New Testament, where Jesus mentions them first in response to St. Peter answering a question, and secondly in speaking to a group of disciples. In these two instances, the concept of authority follows having been given the "keys of the kingdom of heaven", and regards loosing and binding things on earth, and thus, having loosened and bound the same in heaven (Matthew 16:19, Matthew 18:18). A third authority regarding sin is seen without mentioning "keys" in John 20:23.

Not all adherents to the faith in the risen Jesus Christ follow the further doctrinal concepts of sole authority held in any particular church, organization or individual today. One view is that the keys were used for a specific purpose and at a set time; namely at the Day of Pentecost—the baptism of the Holy Spirit. There is much debate regarding the further doctrinal base the church's leadership established in the early centuries.

Many subsequent Restorationist denominations and religious groups today, including the Church of Jesus Christ of Latter-day Saints (LDS Church) and The Family International, believe they also hold this authority. In the LDS Church, the concept is strongly tied to the priesthood keys held by the President of the Church and the Quorum of the Twelve Apostles.

Passage in context

As found in the Gospel of Matthew, chapter 16, within the context of verses 13-20:

In this passage, the word "you" is singular in the original Greek, despite the other apostles being present. A mirroring passage, which does not mention the keys, is also found later in chapter 18, within the context of verses 18-20:

Here, the plural "you" is used.

Day of Pentecost and message

On the day of Pentecost, Peter, in the presence of the other 11 disciples, speaks a message to the Jews from all over the known world, metaphorically using the keys to open the kingdom, inviting hearers in, building the church. Up until this point it was only Jesus who spoke / preached to the disciples.  Here we see Peter act on the commission given to him by Christ in Matthew 16;

Afterwards, Peter speaks a message explaining the completion of several prophecies, concluding with;

See also

 Binding and loosing
 Keys of Heaven
 Matthew 16
 Power of the Keys
 Primacy of Peter

Further reading

References

Ecclesiology
Christian terminology